Emanet Beden (Entrusted Body) is the second studio album by Turkish singer Aynur Aydın. It was released on 28 April 2016 by Seyhan Müzik.

Marketing and content 
Five years after the release of her first album 12 Çeşit La La - 12 Ways to La La in 2011, Aydın released her second studio album Emanet Beden in 2016. The album consists of 12 songs, written by Murat Güneş, Günay Çoban, Zeki Güner, Habil Ceyhan and Moh Denebi.

Aydın, explained the preparation process of the album as follows: "We named the new album “Emanet Beden”. It's a more calm and emotional album. It includes about 10 songs. We made the music of 3 songs together with Moh Denebi. I renewed my sound effects [for this album]. I am very excited. I want to share it with you as soon as possible. I recorded the album in Stockholm, accompanied by a giant orchestra. Günay Çoban, Zeki Güner, Murat Güneş and Habil Ceyhan wrote the lyrics. This time I didn't write anything because their words were already sufficient. But I have made the music for three of the songs. ‘Bir Dakika’ was my lead single which was viewed over a million times. It's a situation that I'm not used to. I've been so used to being an underdog... until I was number 1 everywhere. Everything changed at once. It's gonna take me a while to get used to it. Earlier, the song "Günah Sevap" received similar reception. In fact, the music video was the only clip that remained the most on the charts. But it satisfies me to hear more of my songs mumbling at other people's mouths."

As to why the album was called Emanet Beden, she said: "When I started to live in Turkey I realized how close death was to everyone. The situation was different in Germany. It's not only the terrorism in Turkey; murders of women, car accidents, etc. you see them all the time. You see how short life is. And there's the mystic side. Everything is temporary, the body is just a trust to man. What we can take seriously even when our body is entrusted to us is that we need to be aware that life is made up of beautiful moments."

Track listing

Release history

References 

Aynur Aydın albums
2011 albums